Georgina Helen Henley (born 9 July 1995) is an English actress. She first began acting as a child, and became known for starring as Lucy Pevensie in the fantasy film series The Chronicles of Narnia film series (2005–2010), which grossed over US$1.5 billion worldwide and won her several accolades. This includes nods from several critic groups and an Empire Award nomination.

Following the end of the Chronicles of Narnia franchise, she played a leading role in the thriller film Perfect Sisters (2014), and headlined the independent mystery film The Sisterhood of Night (2015), the latter of which earned her praise and established her as a mature actress. She went on to play Margaret Tudor in the biographical series The Spanish Princess (2019–2020).

Early life
Henley was born to Helen and Mike Henley in Ilkley, West Yorkshire, where she attended Moorfield School for Girls before attending Bradford Grammar School. She has two older sisters, Rachael and Laura. Rachael played the older version of Lucy Pevensie in The Chronicles of Narnia: The Lion, the Witch and the Wardrobe.

Career
Henley made her acting debut as Lucy Pevensie in 2005 film The Chronicles of Narnia: The Lion, the Witch and the Wardrobe, based on the C.S. Lewis novel The Lion, the Witch and the Wardrobe. The film grossed over $745 million worldwide. Henley reprised her role of Lucy Pevensie in the 2008 sequel The Chronicles of Narnia: Prince Caspian and 2010 sequel The Chronicles of Narnia: The Voyage of the Dawn Treader.

Since the release of The Lion, the Witch and the Wardrobe, Henley has appeared as Jill in the stage play Babes in the Wood put on by Upstagers' Theatre Group, which ran from 27 January to 4 February 2006. She starred as Scaramouche in Bradford Grammar School's production of We Will Rock You, which ran from 13 to 16 March 2013. She also appeared as the young Jane Eyre in the 2006 BBC adaptation of Jane Eyre.

Henley appears as Beth in the crime-drama Perfect Sisters a film based on the story of two Canadian teenaged sisters who killed their mother. The film was released in April 2014. Henley plays Mary Warren in The Sisterhood of Night. The film was released in April 2015.

During her time at University of Cambridge Henley studied English and performed on stage in Play It Again, Sam by Woody Allen; The Penelopiad by Margaret Atwood; The Trojan Women; A Clockwork Orange by Anthony Burgess; and in the CUADC/Footlights annual pantomime. Henley has also directed projects including co-directing Sweeney Todd: The Demon Barber of Fleet Street, and After Seymour (the latter of which she co-wrote). In 2016, she appeared in the stage productions of: Skylight by David Hare; Girl, Interrupted (an adaptation of the book with the same name; and Swallow by Stef Smith. In the summer of 2014, Henley went to the Edinburgh Fringe Festival along with Cambridge Shortlegs, performing once again in The Penelopiad in the role of Eurycleia.

In 2015, Henley wrote and directed her first short film, TIDE, the story of a young lesbian couple. In late 2016, Henley starred in the film Access All Areas starring as Nat. In May 2018, it was announced Henley would play Margaret Tudor in the Starz limited series The Spanish Princess, based on the novels The Constant Princess (2005) and The King's Curse (2014) by Philippa Gregory. In January 2019, she was named as a cast member for an upcoming Game of Thrones prequel series, which would not be picked up by HBO.

Personal life
, Henley was a supporter of SOS Children's Villages, an international orphan charity providing homes and mothers for orphaned and abandoned children. Henley resides in London, England.

In 2022, Henley revealed she had contracted necrotising fasciitis six weeks into studying at Cambridge University, and that the illness had "nearly claimed [her] life".

Filmography

Film

Television

As a director
 Tide (2016), short film: director and writer

Awards and nominations

References

External links

 
 

21st-century English actresses
Actresses from Yorkshire
English child actresses
English film actresses
English stage actresses
English television actresses
Living people
People from Ilkley
People educated at Bradford Grammar School
Alumni of Clare College, Cambridge
1995 births